John Ballard (born 14 April 1951) is a Scottish singer-songwriter and record producer, based in Gothenburg, Sweden, where he has a recording studio (Tuff Studios). At Tuff Studios he has produced amongst others, Ace of Base (their first three albums), as well as co-writing some of their songs.

Discography

Ballard has also written songs for the Eurovision Song Contest and also performed twice in the Swedish qualification rounds of ESC in the 1980s:

Other projects
Ballard founded the successful Scandinavian band Bubbles and wrote and recorded most of their songs.

He wrote and recorded the title track for the European release of Ice Age

He wrote most of the tracks for the Swedish boy band Together, including the track "Vänner" (Friends) which went to number one in Sweden.

References

External links

1951 births
Living people
Scottish songwriters
Scottish record producers
Scottish expatriates in Sweden
Scottish emigrants to Sweden